Catalina de Balmaseda y San Martín or Sister Catalina de Cristo (1543-1594) was a Carmelite nun and associate of Teresa of Ávila. She was born in Madrigal de las Altas Torres in Spain to nobility.  Her parents did not teach her to read as they felt that would keep her innocent and away from heresy. This ultimately became an impediment to her as a nun and the order taught her reading before she became a prioress. She was the prioress in Barcelona when she died in 1594. Her body is said to be incorrupt.

References 

16th-century Spanish nuns
Spanish Servants of God
Discalced Carmelite nuns
Carmelite mystics
1543 births
1594 deaths
16th-century Christian mystics
Venerated Carmelites